Şəhər bağında xalq gəzintisi(People's walk in the city park) is one of the earliest films produced in the cinema of Azerbaijan directed by Azeri cinema pioneer Aleksandr Mişon. It was filmed on May 31, 1898 and released on June 21, 1898 in Baku.

The film was shot on 35mm.

See also
List of Azerbaijani films: 1898-1919

1898 films
Azerbaijani silent films
Azerbaijani black-and-white films
Films of the Russian Empire